Darkhaneh (also Romanized as Darkhāneh) is a village in Howmeh Rural District, in the Central District of Masal County, Gilan Province, Iran. At the 2006 census, its population was 247, in 77 families.

References 

Populated places in Masal County